Tural Hikmat oglu Allahverdiyev (born July 29, 2000) is an Azerbaijani judoka.

Life 
Tural Allahverdiyev was born on July 29, 2000 in Azerbaijan to Nizhny Novgorod in the Russian Federation. After living in the  Russian Federation for eight years, the Tural family returned to their homeland Azerbaijan and at the age of 8 began learning the secrets of Greco-Roman Wrestling. At this time Tural started wrestling, and Tural, who tried several sports, finally practiced Judo at the Yasamal Sports Club.

Tural is also a member of the Azerbaijan National Team in Sambo, Grappling, Mas-Wrestling, Zorkhana and National-Wrestling.

References 

.World Mas-Wrestling Federation=06.06.2019
.Interview about sports=17.02.2018
.Azerbaijan Sports Journal=10.04.2016

Azerbaijani male judoka
Living people
2000 births
People from Baku
21st-century Azerbaijani people